Gallibacterium melopsittaci is a bacterium from the genus of Gallibacterium. Gallibacterium melopsittaci can cause salpingitis, septicaemia, peritonitis and bacteremia in birds like parakeets.

References

External links
Type strain of Gallibacterium melopsittaci at BacDive -  the Bacterial Diversity Metadatabase

Pasteurellales
Bacteria described in 2009